Bogra District, officially known as Bogura District, is a district in the northern part of Bangladesh, in the Rajshahi Division. Bogra is an industrial city where many small and mid-sized companies are sited. Bogra was a part of the ancient Pundravardhana territory and the ruins of its capital can be found in northern Bogra.

History

Ancient history
In the ancient period, Bogra District was a part of the territory of the Pundras or Paundras, which were known by the name of Pundravardhana, one of the kingdoms of Eastern India and was separated by the Karatoya River from the more easterly kingdom of Prag-Jyotisha or Kamrupa. The name Pundravardhana frequently occurs in the Mahabharata, Ramayana, and the Puranas. According to the Mahabharata and the Puranas, Vasudeva, a powerful prince of the Pundra family, ruled over Pundravardhana as far back as 1280 B.C. The claims of the district to antiquity, however, mostly rely on an association with the old, fortified town that is now known as Mahasthangarh.

The district was under the rule of the Mauryas in the 4th and 3rd centuries B.C. This is evidenced by the presence of pillars of Ashoka in many parts of Pundravardhana and the discovery of an ancient Brahmi inscription at Mahasthangarh in this district. Bhadra Bahu, a high monk of the Jain religion and the son of a Brahmin of Kotivarsha, was the Jain-Guru of Chandra Gupta Maurya. Ashoka was a firm believer in Buddhism and put to death many naked sectarians, presumably the Jains, in Pundravardhana.

The Gupta authority of the third-to-fifth centuries A.D. over this district is revealed by the discovery of several inscriptions of that period from Pundravardhana, which was a Bhukti under the rule of Guptas till the end of the fifth century.

At the beginning of the seventh century, Sasanka came upon the throne of Gauda and exercised his authority over Pundravardhana, including this district. After the death of Sasanka, the region fell under the rule of Harshavardhana (606–647). This is evident from the account of a Chinese pilgrim Xuanzang, who may have visited Pundravardhana in 640 A.D.

Mediaeval period
By the middle of the eighth century, Gopala I assumed control over the affairs of North Bengal, establishing a royal house known as the Pala Dynasty. After Gopal was elected king, he took his seat in Pundravardhana and ruled over the region up to c. 780 and was succeeded by his son Dharmapala (c. 781–821). The Pala Kings had peaceful possession of this district until the end of their rule over Bengal in the twelfth century. Dharmapala was the son of and successor to Gopala, extended his power beyond Pundravardhana. Like his father, he was a Buddhist and founded the Buddhist Vihara at Somapura Mahavihara in Varendra, the ruins of which in Naogaon District have been discovered.

The Senas originally came from the Deccan Plateau and settled in West Bengal. Vijayasena was the first ruler of the dynasty. He defeated the last Pala king Madanapala and established his authority over the district. He was succeeded by his son Vallal Sena (1160–1178), who was in possession of the district. He built his capital at Bhabanipur Shaktipeeth, a Shakti Peeth in this district. Lakshmanasena (1178–1204), the son and successor of Vallal Sena, exercised authority over the district until he was driven out by Muhammad bin Bakhtiyar Khalji in 1204. Even after this date, a dynasty of Sena Rajas ruled over the north-eastern tract of this district for nearly a century as feudal chiefs of the Muslim rulers of Bengal. Their capital was at Kamalpur, a few miles to the north of Bhabanipur, a site of pilgrimage for Hindu devotees, and a little to the south of Sherpur Upazila. Achyuta Sena was the last prince of the line.

British Era
The present Bogra District was first formed in 1821 during British rule. In the 1901 census, the population of the district on a reduced area was around 854,533, an increase of 11% over the past decade, and it also revealed there was no town with a population above 10,000. The famous Prafulla Chaki (1888–1908) was born in this district.

Post independence

During the Bangladesh Liberation War of 1971, fighting occurred in the Bogra district during the Battle of Bogra between the allied troops of Mukti Bahini and Indian Army, and the Pakistan Army , with the former being victorious.

In 2018, the Government of Bangladesh changed the spelling of the district's name from Bogra to Bogura.

Geography and climate

Formation of land

The area consisting of Sariakandi Upazila, Gabtali Upazila, Sonatala Upazila, and the majority of Dhunat is called the eastern alluvial tract. It is fertilized by silt from floodwaters. The eastern alluvion is one of the most fertile and prosperous areas in Bogra; jute, aman paddy, sugarcane and pulses are locally grown. Sometimes, as many as three cycles of crops are grown on one field in a year with little diminution in productivity.

The western portion of the district is well-wooded with dense, shrub jungles in Upazilas of Sherpur and in parts of Sibganj, which has a large portion of cultivable wasteland. This part of the district is slightly higher than the eastern parts and is mostly above flood level. The soil of this part is generally suited to the growth of paddy. Adamdighi is well known for the fine qualities of rice, which is also grown to some extent in the Shibganj Upazila.

The tract to the east of the Karatoya is a part of the valley of the Brahmaputra river; it is generally low-lying and intersected by numerous khals (canals, shallow swamps and marshes). It is subject to yearly inundation from the overflow of the Brahmaputra and gets a rich deposit of silt. There is very little jungle and almost the entire area is under cultivation.

Rivers
There are many rivers in the Bogra District. The Karatoya is the central divider of the water channel in the district. The other rivers may be classified into the eastern and western systems. Some of the major rivers in this district are:

 The Bangali
 The Karatoya
 The Jamuna
 The Nagar
 The Tulshiganga
 The Isamoti
 The Vodraboti River at Sahajahanpur

Climate
The district has a humid subtropical climate. The average annual rainfall in this part of the country varies from 1400 mm to 1600 mm.

Demographics

According to the 2022 Bangladesh census, Bogra District has a population of 3,733,106, of which 1,852,193 are male, 1,880,480 are female and 433 are third genders. Rural population was 2,771,892 (74.25%) while the urban population was 961,214 (25.75%). Bogra District has a literacy rate of 72.44% for the population seven years and above constituting 75.39% for males, 69.56% for females and 58.41% for third genders.

The main language of the district is Bengali; a Northern Bengali dialect is commonly used.

Administration
 Administrator of Zila Porishod: Mokbul Hossain
 Deputy Commissioner (DC): Nur-E Alam Siddique

Upazilas
Bogra has 12 Subdistricts (Upazilas):

 Adamdighi
 Bogra Sadar
 Sherpur
 Dhunat
 Dhupchanchia
 Gabtali
 Kahaloo
 Nandigram
 Shajahanpur
 Sariakandi
 Shibganj
 Sonatala

Education

 Bogra Zilla School
 Bogra Cantonment Public School and College
 Bogra Polytechnic Institute
 Government Azizul Haque College
 Government Mustafabia Alia Madrasha
 Shaheed Ziaur Rahman Medical College
 Bogra Govt. College
 Govt. Shah-Sultan College
 Bogra Govt. Mujibur Rahman Mahila College
 Kahaloo University College
 Bogra Govt. Girls' High School
 Bogra Armed Police Battalion Public School And college
 Police Lines School and College, Bogra
 BIAM Model School and College, Bogra
 Pundra University of Science & Technology
 Millennium Scholstic School & College, Jahangirabad Bogra

Notable residents
 Mohammad Ali Bogra (19091963), Prime Minister of Pakistan (1953-1955), was elected to the legislature from Bogra.
 Prafulla Chaki (1888–1908), revolutionary and nationalist, was born in Bihar village.
 Mafiz Ali Chowdhury (1919-1994), cabinet minister, was elected to parliament from Bogra.
 Tarun Majumdar (born 1931), Indian Bengali film director, was born in Bogra.
 M. R. Akhtar Mukul (19292004), author and journalist, migrated to Mahasthangarh after the Partition in 1947.
 Ziaur Rahman (19361981), President of Bangladesh (19771981), spent part of his childhood in Bagbari village.
 Begum Khaleda Zia (born 1945), former prime minister of Bangladesh, was elected to parliament from Bogra.

See also
 Majhira Cantonment
 Districts of Bangladesh

Notes

References

 
Districts of Bangladesh
Districts of Bangladesh established before 1971